Tadeusz Grzelak (24 December 1929 – 14 October 1996) was a Polish boxer. He competed in the men's light heavyweight event at the 1952 Summer Olympics.

References

1929 births
1996 deaths
Polish male boxers
Olympic boxers of Poland
Boxers at the 1952 Summer Olympics
Sportspeople from Pinsk
People from Polesie Voivodeship
Light-heavyweight boxers
20th-century Polish people